BCL2/adenovirus E1B 19 kDa protein-interacting protein 3-like is a protein that in humans is encoded by the BNIP3L gene.

Function 

This gene is a member of the BCL2/adenovirus E1B 19 kd-interacting protein (BNIP) family.  It interacts with the E1B 19 kDa protein which is responsible for the protection of virally induced cell death, as well as E1B 19 kDa-like sequences of BCL2, also an apoptotic protector.  The protein encoded by this gene is a functional homolog of BNIP3, a proapoptotic protein.  This protein may function simultaneously with BNIP3 and may play a role in tumor suppression.

Interactions 

BNIP3L has been shown to interact with STEAP3.

References

External links

Further reading